Yargo may refer to:

Yargo, Burkina Faso
Yargo Department, Burkina Faso
Yargo (novel) by Jacqueline Susann
Yargo (band), 1980s Manchester band